The  Korea Professional Baseball season was the 32nd season in the history of the Korea Professional Baseball. The Samsung Lions won the regular season and Korean series.

Season structure

Regular season
For the 2013 season, due to the admission of the NC Dinos as the KBO's ninth team, each team's schedule was reduced from 133 games to 128 games during the regular season with the new schedule arranging for each team to play every other team 16 times.

All-Star Game
On 19 July, the best players in the KBO participated in the Korean All-Star game at Pohang Baseball Stadium. The franchises participating were divided into two regions: Eastern League (Samsung Lions, Doosan Bears, Lotte Giants, SK Wyverns) and Western League (Kia Tigers, Hanwha Eagles, LG Twins, Nexen Heroes, NC Dinos). The titles 'Eastern' and 'Western' do not directly correspond to the geographical regions of the franchises involved, as both SK and Doosan, being from Incheon and Seoul respectively, are based in the Western region of Korea, despite representing the Eastern League. Unlike in Major League Baseball, the Korean All-Star Game does not determine home-field advantage in the Korean Series. The 2013 Korean All-Star Game was won by the Eastern League, 4–2.

Postseason
The 2013 Korea Professional Baseball season culminated in its championship series, known as the Korean Series. The top four teams qualified for the postseason based on their records. The team with the best record gained a direct berth into the Korean Series, while the other three teams competed for the remaining spot in the Korea Series in a step-ladder playoff system:

Semi-Playoff (best-of-five-game series, had been originally best-of-three-game-games, became best-of-five-game series in 2008)
Regular Season third-place team vs. Regular Season fourth-place team
Playoff (best-of-five-game-series, had been originally best-of-seven-game series, became best-of-five-game-series in 2009)
Regular Season second-place team vs. Semi-Playoff Winner
Korean Series (best-of-seven-game series)
Regular Season first-place-team vs. Playoff Winner

Unlike the regular season, no playoff game can result in a draw so each series can be completed as it was intended to be, whether it be a best-of-five-game or best-of-seven-games series.

To Determine the Final Standings
Champion (1st place): Korean Series Winner
Runner-up (2nd place): Korean Series Loser
3rd–9th place: Sort by Regular Season record except teams to play in the Korean Series.

Standings

Postseason

Semi-Playoff

Playoff

Korean Series

Foreign players 
For the second straight year, there are no foreign hitters in the KBO, as all nine teams use their foreign player allotments on pitchers.

References

External links
Official Site

KBO League seasons
Korea Professional Baseball Season, 2013
Korea Korea Professional Baseball season